Rivers United Football Club is a professional football club based in Port Harcourt, Rivers State that participates in the Nigerian Professional Football League, the highest level of domestic Nigerian football. The club was formed by the merger of Sharks F.C. and Dolphins F.C. in 2016. Their home stadium is the Yakubu Gowon Stadium, formerly Liberation Stadium in Elekahia that has a seating capacity of 30,000.

Rivers United FC has remained in the top flight since its first season. They have been performing well in this season’s CAF Confederation Cup where they defeated a South African opponent to set up a highly anticipated matchup against Enyimba.

History
Rivers United was founded in 2016 after the Rivers state government got permission to merge Dolphins FC and Sharks FC. Both clubs were run by the state government and were having difficulty with finances off the pitch. Sharks were relegated to the First Division in 2015 while Dolphins had barely escaped after a 2–2 draw on the final day. Rivers United' crest contains both a shark and a dolphin as a result of the merge.

Stanley Eguma was appointed Rivers' first coach and led them to a win in their first ever league match, 1–0 over Enyimba.

The club finished second in the 2016 Nigerian Premier League which qualified them for the 2017 CAF Champions League for the first time. A four-goal second-leg win over Mali's AS Bamako with Esosa Igbinoba and Bernard Ovoke each scoring braces put Rivers past the preliminary round. However, they were eliminated by Sudan's Al-Merrikh 4–3 on aggregate in the first round after losing a 3–0 first round lead.

2021–22: Nigerian Professional League Champions 
On June 25, 2022, Rivers United won their first Nigeria Professional League title with four games to spare after Akwa United beat their nearest challengers, Plateau United 2-1 in Uyo.

Rivers United ended the season with 77 points, breaking the league record of 73 points in a season.

The 2021-22 Nigeria Professional League title is their first league title since the merger between Dolphins and Sharks FC of Port Harcourt in 2016. It is also the first NPFL title by a Rivers-based side since the Dolphins won in 2011.

Rivers United won 23 games, drew 8, and lost 7 of their 38 league games as they claimed the 2021-22 league title with 10 points ahead of their closest rivals, Plateau United.

Staff
Head coach
 Stanley Eguma
Assistant coach 
 Fatai Osho 
Acting General Manager
 Okey Kpalukwu
Welfare Secretary
 Albert Chinwo
Media officer
  Mayuku Charles

Current squad
As of 13 February 2023

 (Captain)

Notes

External links
Rivers United FC official site

Association football clubs established in 2016
Football clubs in Port Harcourt
2016 establishments in Nigeria
2010s establishments in Rivers State
Sports clubs in Nigeria